is the debut studio album by Japanese pop singer and songwriter Sayuri. It was released on May 17, 2017, by Ariola Japan.

Release 
The album was released on May 17, 2017, in Japan. The album was also available as a limited edition Blu-ray/DVD combination, the Blu-ray edition featured all music videos and the DVD edition featured a live digest video. All singles, except "Ru-Rararu-Ra-Rurararu-Ra-", were available on CD and DVD (containing the music video for the single). Singles were released in different editions, consist of three editions: regular edition, limited edition type A & B and limited anime edition.

Three songs were used as ending theme songs for anime, "Mikazuki", "Sore wa Chiisana Hikari no Youna" and "Parallel Line" for Rampo Kitan: Game of Laplace, Erased and Scum's Wish respectively. The first single from the album was "Mikazuki" and it was released on August 25, 2015. The single reached number 20 in the Oricon Chart. The single was followed by "Sore wa Chiisana Hikari no Youna", "Ru-Rararu-Ra-Rurararu-Ra-", "Furaregai Girl" and "Parallel Line". "Parallel Line" reached number 10 in the Oricon and Japan Hot 100, making it the highest-charting single in both chart for her to date. The album itself charted at number 3 in the Oricon chart and 4 in the Japan Hot Album.

Track listing

Charts

Release history

References

External links
 Official website of Sayuri

Sayuri (musician) albums
2017 debut albums
Japanese-language albums
Sony Music albums